Esther Vanhomrigh or Van Homrigh (known by the pseudonym Vanessa; c. 1688 – 2 June 1723), an Irish woman of Dutch descent, was a longtime lover and correspondent of Jonathan Swift. Swift's letters to her were published after her death. Her fictional name "Vanessa" was created by Swift by taking Van from her surname, Vanhomrigh, and adding Esse, the pet form of her first name, Esther.

She was fictionalized as "Vanessa" in Swift's poem Cadenus and Vanessa (1713). In the poem, he wrote:

Each girl, when pleased with what is taught,
Will have the teacher in her thought.

Life
Esther was the daughter of Bartholomew Van Homrigh, a merchant of Amsterdam and afterwards of Dublin, who was appointed commissary of the stores by King William upon his expedition into Ireland: he was Lord Mayor of Dublin 1697–8. Her mother, also named Esther, was the daughter of John Stone, an Irish commissioner of revenue. She grew up at Celbridge Abbey in County Kildare.

Her father died in 1703, and his widow moved her family to London in 1707. Esther became acquainted with Swift in December of that year while the family was en route for London, at Dunstable, and it was here that their intense 17-year relationship began. She was 22 years younger than Swift, and it was obvious from the beginning that he admired Esther for her rugged qualities; he did not admire very delicate women. Esther was said "not to be a beauty",  although it is difficult to be sure about this since no contemporary portrait of her exists (the famous 1868 Millais portrait is a work of artistic imagination). Swift later served as her tutor. After her mother died in 1714, Esther followed Swift to Ireland, and returned to Celbridge Abbey, but she was desperately miserable there.

Their relationship was fraught. It was broken up after 17 years by Swift's relationship with another woman, Esther Johnson, whom he called "Stella", in 1723. Swift had known Stella since about 1690, when she was a little girl in the household of his employer Sir William Temple; their relationship was intense and it is possible that they had secretly married in 1716. Esther is thought to have asked Swift not to see Stella again, and he apparently refused, thus putting an end to their relationship.

Esther never recovered from his rejection and died on 2 June 1723, probably from tuberculosis contracted from nursing her sister Mary, who had died of the same disease in 1720, as had their mother before her; some accused Swift of inadvertently causing her death.

Her father had left her well provided for, but she was burdened by debts accumulated by her mother and her spendthrift brother Bartholomew. In her will, she named the barrister Robert Marshall and George Berkeley, the celebrated philosopher and future Bishop of Cloyne, executors and joint residuary legatees of her estate, although she knew neither man well. Due to the debts, a protracted lawsuit  ensued and a large part of the estate was lost in legal costs. It was widely reported that she had made it a condition of the inheritance that her executors publish all her correspondence with Swift, but in fact, no such stipulation seems to have been made.

Swift, whose letters to her were published after her death, is not mentioned in her will, perhaps a final retaliation against a man whose neglect made her "live a life like a languishing death".

Legacy

A ward in St Patrick's University Hospital is named “Vanessa” in her honour.

Pre-Raphaelite artist John Everett Millais painted a fancy portrait of her in 1868, over 100 years after her death: Vanessa. The painting depicts Esther holding a letter, presumably written to or from Swift. The portrait is an imagined likeness: no contemporary portrait of Esther is known to survive and there are only a few rather vague descriptions of her appearance.

Margaret Louisa Woods wrote a novel inspired by her life titled Esther Vanhomrigh (1891).

Elizabeth Myers, wife of Littleton C. Powys, who was a brother of John Cowper Powys, wrote a novel titled The Basilisk of St. James, (London, 1945, Chapman and Hall), which has as its protagonist Jonathan Swift. Central to the plot is the personal conflict that arose from Swift's relationships with both Esther Vanhomrigh (Vanessa) and Esther Johnson, nicknamed Stella by Swift.

In the 1994 film Words Upon the Window Pane, based on the play by William Butler Yeats, she is played by Orla Brady: the plot turns on a seance in Dublin in the 1920s where the ghosts of Swift, Stella and Vanessa appear to resume their 200-year-old quarrel.

References

Sources
 Evelyn Hardy, The Conjured Spirit, Swift: A Study in the Relationship of Swift, Stella, and Vanessa, 1949 
 Sir Walter Scott, Life of Jonathan Swift, 1829

External links
 

1680s births
1723 deaths
18th-century deaths from tuberculosis
English letter writers
Women letter writers
English people of Dutch descent
Irish people of Dutch descent
17th-century Irish women writers
18th-century Irish women writers
Jonathan Swift
Tuberculosis deaths in Ireland